Maximiliano Francisco Lugo (born 4 December 1989), known as Maxi Lugo, is an Argentine-Paraguayan professional footballer who plays as a midfielder for Bolivian Primera División side Club Aurora.

Career
Lugo started off his senior career with a three-year spell with local side Lanús, making the first of twenty-eight appearances on 1 March 2009 during a win away to Gimnasia y Esgrima. He was loaned out on two occasions, to Atlanta for 2011–12 and to Unión Santa Fe for 2012–13. He featured a total of sixteen times for those aforementioned clubs. On 23 January 2013, Lugo joined Unión Mar del Plata of Torneo Argentino A. Six appearances followed. Six months after signing, Lugo was on the move again as he agreed to join Paraguayan Primera División side Rubio Ñu. He scored on his sixth appearance versus Guaraní.

In his first three seasons with Rubio Ñu, Lugo scored fourteen goals in seventy-six encounters. For the 2016 and 2017 campaigns, he was loaned back to the Argentine Primera División. In January 2016, San Martín temporarily signed Lugo. He returned to Rubio Ñu after the 2016–17 Argentine Primera División season, making twenty-three appearances as the club finished 22nd. To conclude 2017, Lugo had a short spell with Temperley. On 18 January 2018, Belgrano became Lugo's eighth career club. He appeared in nine fixtures for Belgrano. Lugo left Belgrano in February 2021.

In March 2022, 32-year old Lugo joined Bolivian Primera División side Club Aurora.

Career statistics
.

References

External links

1989 births
Living people
Argentine footballers
Argentine expatriate footballers
Sportspeople from Lanús
Association football midfielders
Primera Nacional players
Torneo Argentino A players
Paraguayan Primera División players
Paraguayan División Intermedia players
Chilean Primera División players
Bolivian Primera División players
Club Atlético Lanús footballers
Club Atlético Atlanta footballers
Unión de Santa Fe footballers
Unión de Mar del Plata footballers
Club Rubio Ñu footballers
San Martín de San Juan footballers
Club Atlético Temperley footballers
Club Atlético Belgrano footballers
Coquimbo Unido footballers
Club Aurora players
Expatriate footballers in Paraguay
Expatriate footballers in Chile
Expatriate footballers in Bolivia
Argentine expatriate sportspeople in Paraguay
Argentine expatriate sportspeople in Chile
Argentine expatriate sportspeople in Bolivia
Argentine Primera División players